John Julian McKeithen (May 28, 1918 – June 4, 1999) was an American lawyer and politician who served as the 49th governor of Louisiana from 1964 to 1972.

Early life 
McKeithen was born in Grayson, Louisiana on May 28, 1918. His father was a farmer.

He studied at High Point College, and later received a law degree from Louisiana State University in 1942. He served in the 77th Infantry Division in the Pacific Theater during World War II. After the war, he settled in Columbia, Louisiana and set up a law practice.

Political career

1948–1963 
McKeithen was elected to the Louisiana House of Representatives in 1948. Governor Earl K. Long appointed him as floor leader despite his lack of experience and low profile. He lost the race for the Democratic nomination for lieutenant governor in 1952, and in 1954 was elected to the Louisiana Public Service Commission.

First term as governor 

McKeithen entered the 1963 Democratic primary for Governor of Louisiana. He ran as a populist, running direct-to-camera commercials with a signature catchphrase of "Won't you he'p me?" As was typical for Southern Democrats, he ran as a segregationist, insinuating that his chief rival (New Orleans mayor deLesseps Story Morrison) was an integrationist supported by the NAACP. McKeithen won the Democratic nomination, which in the Deep South at the time was tantamount to election, and defeated the Republican candidate Charlton Lyons in the 1964 general election.

McKeithen's first term saw the construction of the Louisiana Superdome, reforms to the state code of ethics, and the Civil Rights Movement.

Shortly after McKeithen's election, he began sending secret payments through the Louisiana State Sovereignty Commission to the Ku Klux Klan leadership, in an attempt to "buy peace" and suppress Klan violence. In one incident, a confident of McKeithen's was sent to Bogalusa with $10,000 in cash to be split equally between local Klan leaders and the local chapter of Deacons for Defense and Justice. These payments by McKeithen were discovered through declassified FBI records in 2016, through FOIA.

Despite his running as a segregationist in 1963, he oversaw the beginning of school integration in Louisiana, and called out the Louisiana National Guard to protect civil rights activists marching from Bogalusa to Baton Rouge. In a speech to a Black audience in 1966, he said regarding integration: "I know I’m not leaving this state, and I don’t think you’re leaving either. So we’ve got to solve our problem."

McKeithen was popular in his first term, and successfully engineered the passage of a constitutional referendum that allowed governors to run for re-election, the first time this had been allowed in Louisiana in the 20th century.

Second term as governor 
McKeithen defeated Congressman John Rarick by a wide margin in the 1967 Democratic primary for Governor, and was elected unopposed in the 1968 general election. During his second term, a series of articles in Life magazine alleged that he was connected to the New Orleans mafia, though definitive proof did not emerge.

Later life and death 
After the completion of his second term, McKeithen retired to his farm in Columbia, Louisiana and continued to practice law. He managed an oil and gas company and was appointed to the Board of Supervisors of Louisiana State University in 1983.

McKeithen underwent heart surgery in 1997, after which his health declined. On June 4, 1999, McKeithen died at the age of 81 in Columbia.

References

1918 births
1999 deaths
Democratic Party members of the Louisiana House of Representatives
Democratic Party governors of Louisiana
People from Caldwell Parish, Louisiana
Louisiana State University alumni
Louisiana lawyers
Members of the Louisiana Public Service Commission
Military personnel from Louisiana
Recipients of the Distinguished Service Cross (United States)
United States Army personnel of World War II
United States Army officers
American Methodists
20th-century American lawyers
20th-century American politicians
People from Columbia, Louisiana